Ver de terre (plural: vers de terre) is French for earthworm.

It can also refer to any of the caecilians found in the Seychelles, namely:

 Grandisonia alternans
 Grandisonia brevis
 Grandisonia larvata
 Grandisonia sechellensis
 Hypogeophis rostratus
 Praslinia cooperi

Animal common name disambiguation pages